Charles Fernando Basílio da Silva or simply Charles (born 14 February 1985), is a Brazilian former football defensive midfielder.

Career
Da Silva arrived at Cruzeiro in October 2003, at age 18, as a defender in the junior team. He was loaned to Ipatinga in 2005, when he won the State Championship. The next year, he was a defender with Cabofriense and returned to Ipatinga for the 2006 and 2007 seasons. Da Silva returned to Cruzeiro in May 2007 for his first opportunity in the professional team, where he remained until the end of August 2008, when 70% of rights were traded to Lokomotiv Moscow of Russia.

He played 67 games for Cruzeiro and scored 7 goals.

On 4 February 2013, in an exchange for Luan, he signed for Palmeiras until the end of season.

Honours
Ipatinga
Campeonato Mineiro: 2005

Cruzeiro
Campeonato Mineiro: 2008

Santos
Campeonato Paulista: 2011
Copa Libertadores: 2011

Palmeiras
Campeonato Brasileiro Série B: 2013

References

External links

1985 births
Living people
Brazilian expatriate footballers
Expatriate footballers in Russia
Expatriate footballers in Saudi Arabia
Expatriate footballers in Turkey
Campeonato Brasileiro Série A players
Campeonato Brasileiro Série B players
Russian Premier League players
Süper Lig players
Cruzeiro Esporte Clube players
Ipatinga Futebol Clube players
Santos FC players
Sociedade Esportiva Palmeiras players
FC Lokomotiv Moscow players
Al-Raed FC players
Antalyaspor footballers
Association football midfielders
Footballers from Rio de Janeiro (city)
Brazilian footballers